Lee Young-rok (born 9 January 1965) is a South Korean fencer. He competed in the team foil event at the 1988 Summer Olympics.

References

External links
 

1965 births
Living people
South Korean male foil fencers
Olympic fencers of South Korea
Fencers at the 1988 Summer Olympics
Asian Games medalists in fencing
Fencers at the 1986 Asian Games
Asian Games gold medalists for South Korea
Medalists at the 1986 Asian Games